is a short-lived SD Gundam manga series, a spin-off from the popular Gundam anime. It is authored by Masato Ichishiki and ran in Comic Bom Bom. The Bancho in the title is Japanese slang for student delinquents

Story

The series appears to be a sequel to the earlier SD Gundam Musha Maruden. Official relations were formed between Earth and the land of Ark. At an inter-racial school attended by humans and Mobile Citizens, young Ryuunosuke befriends fellow student Kokuryu. Life at the school can sometimes be fierce, with student gangs seeking to disrupt the harmony. But in the face of this, Kokuryu reveals a powerful ability- although he normally looks like a little kid, he can transform into the maturer samurai warrior Kokuryu Gundam. The series initially involves his battles against similar robotic creatures along with Gundam friends such as the bishōnen Hakuou Gundam and good natured/rough and ready Sekijishi Gundam. Eventually a mysterious group emerges, forcing Kokuryu and company to leave simple schoolyard scraps behind and engage in life or death combat.
The general merchandising gimmick for this series involves the Gundam's being able to combine. This is similar to the gimmick for the series Transformers: Energon

Characters

Each of the Gundams are introduced in an order with visual similarities to the same order of the Universal Century:
Kokuryu Gundam resembles the RX-78GP01 Gundam "Zephirantes" from Mobile Suit Gundam 0083:stardust memory
Hakuou Gundam resembles the MSZ-006 Zeta Gundam from Mobile Suit Zeta Gundam
Sekijishi Gundam resembles the MSZ-010 Double Zeta Gundam from Mobile Suit Gundam ZZ
Seirou Gundam resembles the RX-78GP02A Gundam "Physalis" from Mobile Suit Gundam 0083: Stardust Memory

Main Characters
Kokuryu Gundam (黒龍頑駄無(こくりゅうがんだむ)) - "Black Dragon Gundam". A transfer student from the land of Ark and star of the story, Kokuryu is similar to many past SD Gundam leads and leads of the shōnen genre. Although generally energetic and easy going, he also possesses a strong sense of justice and fiery temper which triggers his transformation to Bancho form. When Ryuunosuke and himself were brutally attacked by the Dom Alliance, his rage sparked the Hot-Blooded Circuit (Nekketsu Kairo/熱血回路(ねっけつかいろ)). In his Bancho form he has access to a range of powerful weapons including his signature samurai sword, leg cannons and an unbreakable head crest which can deflect most attacks. He also suffers a slight personality change; aware of his own power, the maturer Kokuryu is a Gundam of few words who often only talks to belittle his opponent for an ineffective attack. However, he still retains a strong desire to protect innocents and will panic if his opponent endangers his friends. The main causes of anger for him are insults, such as someone threatening his friends or his pride (usually done by Hakuou). He usually reverts to his child form once his adrenaline rush has worn off. His strength in battle is countered by his struggles with his school work, where he consistently receives low grades due to a mix of his own inability and having his time eaten up by his recent adventures. He has an addiction to pudding, once over eating so many of them he lacked the energy and motivation to transform. Kokuryu's transformed form is a mix of the look of a samurai and the stereotypical Japanese school punk. His personal symbol is a star. Near the end of the series, Kokuryu seemingly perished attempting to destroy the Axis that was about to strike Earth (a reference to Char's Counterattack). However, he returned alive and well a few years later, after having crashed down in America.
Kokuryuu Gundam Special Attack  (龍頑駄無・特攻(こくりゅうがんだむ・とっこう))- After Kokuryu is mortally wounded by Seirou, Ryuunosuke becomes desperate to find a way to save his friend. Venturing out with the Dom Alliance he encounters the Death Teacher Fukutsuzawa, who claims to be capable of healing Kokuryu. What he does, however, is remove the Hot-Blooded Circuit, plunging Kokuryuu into catatonia, and implanting it in his own created Banchou, Grey. As Ryuunosuke and the others are thrashed, their memories of Kokuryuu inspire them to launch one final attack: a simultaneous headbutt very much like Kokuryuu's trademark Sunrise attack. This event reawakens Kokuryuu and spurs his transformation into a new form. This new look includes flame patterns on his armour and clothes and a new sword. This form lasted only a short period and Kokuryu soon powered down into his standard mature form during a second battle with Seirou. He has since used it twice more in battles where his regular Banchou form has proven too weak to win. The fact it can only be used for a few minutes and the end of the limit signalled by a beeping sound marks it as a possible reference to Ultraman.

Yoshikumo Ryuunosuke (良雲龍之介(よしくもりゅうのすけ)) - A young boy who is bullied by the Dom Alliance at school, Ryuunosuke befriends Kokuryu when the latter is transferred to his school, becomes his classmate and his homestay charge. This friendship led to Kokuryu transforming for the first time to protect Ryuunosuke and himself from an unprovoked attack by the Doms. Ryuunosuke is an only child who lives with his mother. His hobby is building Gunpla models, an interest which becomes of benefit to Kokuryu once they discover model kit parts can become actual upgrades for Mobile Citizens. After Kokuryuu sacrifices himself against the axis, Ryuunosuke goes on to graduate from primary school and is seen as a ninth-grader at the end of the final chapter.
Dom Alliance (怒武連合(どむれんごう)) - Initially a small student gang who cruelly victimizes Ryuunosuke with intense beatings, they become allies out of respect when Kokuryu bests them in a fight. After helping to fight off the Tears Of Time Group, they earn new respect from their fellow students and begin to become better members of society. Their leader is the mohawk wearing Gaia Dom and their signature attack is Jet Scream Attack.
Hakuou Gundam (白凰頑駄無(はくおうがんだむ))- "White Phoenix Gundam". This handsome gentleman student council president of the 7th Musha Elementary School with a devoted fanbase of young women and an ego to match, Hakuou Gundam is yet another character based in a typical anime character type (the refined pretty boy). Although publicly he presents himself as friendly and good natured, in private he is revealed to be more calculating. Possessing a large ego, he personally arranged a tournament in an attempt to beat Kokuryu in a fight, where they were revealed to be evenly matched and managed to completely destroy the large stadium Hakuou had booked for their duel. Hakuou has somehow learned how to remain in his mature form constantly though excessive energy use will revert him to his child form, as was the case during his fight with Kokuryu. Once reverted to his child form he loses his usual cool and desperately demands that people show him respect. He also appears to know of the concept of Gigantic Musha Mode, and drops subtle hints that his battle against Kokuryu also serves as a test to see if his opponent would give him a significant power boost if combined with. He launched a mission to rescue the captives of Gaza Captain which forced him to yet again team with Kokuryu and new ally Sekijishi. Although his attitude and charms can often annoy Kokuryu, they are often forced to be allies. Hakuou's long hair can split in half and attach to his arms as feathers, giving him the ability to fly. His personal symbol is a bird. At the end of the series he is shown to have become student council president at his new middle high school, having been elected the first year he came. He may have feelings for Tomoe.
Hakuou Gundam Elegant (白凰頑駄無颯爽(はくおうがんだむえれがんと))- After learning of Kokuryu's upgrade, Hakuou tries without luck to grant himself a similar form to match his rival. A mysterious silent tengu-like Gundam engages him in combat, easily outmatching his skill. When Hakuou's aides intervene, the mysterious Gundam attacks them too. Desperate to save his friends and aware of their importance to him, Hakuou unlocks his new form. Emerging from a giant white rose bud, he is dressed much like a buccaneer and shares a similar power growth to Kokuryu. Likewise, the form lasts only a short time (currently, even shorter than Kokuryu's upgrade). Hakuou summoned the power again to help Kokuryuu in the final battle.
Sekijishi Gundam (赤獅子頑駄無(せきじしがんだむ)) - "Red Lion Gundam". A good natured, rough and ready Gundam Bancho who Kokuryu and Ryuunosuke encounter during a class visit to the Doros Ocean Primary School. Aware of Gaza Captain's evil plans to take over another beach, Sekijishi attacks the school and attempts to destroy it with a missile. Kokuryu stops him and convinces him that his friends consider him more important than the beach. Soon after he saves Kokuryu from an assassination attempt from Seirou by using the 'forbidden' attack from his head mounted cannon. Seirou abducted him, leading to Kokuryu and company heading out to save him. Upon finding him, Seirou had briefly brainwashed him in order to gain the power of Gigantic Musha Mode. After the combination wore off, Sekijishi regained his memory. Sekijishi resembles a lion, to the point where he can transform into an animal-like form for combat and his powered down state resembles a lion cub or even a 'shiisaa'. He will often revert to this cub state after using his head cannon. His side skirt armour converts into a personal surfboard and he is devoted to the sea and surfing, even calling himself 'a king of the land who loves the sea'. His personal symbol is a shark. Ryuunosuke and his classmates fondly call him 'Set-chan'. He is last seen returning to protecting the oceans from harm.
Seirou Gundam (青狼頑駄無(せいろうがんだむ)) - "Blue Wolf Gundam". A mysterious Bancho who resembles a wolf. The top pupil of the 6th Northeast Circle Musha Primary School, Seirou has been trained as a deadly hunter/killer. As a final test he hunted down and slaughtered all three of his teachers. He has the ability to teleport and protect himself via a form of sub-space. Seirou is allied with Desth Teacher Fukutsuzawa for a mysterious purpose. After a number of failed attempts, Seirou succeeded in sniping Kokuryu with a special bullet which left Kokuryu near death. After eventually recovering, Kokuryu and Seirou engaged in a multi-stage duel. After blowing through various power ups and gimmicks, the two engaged in a bare knuckle fight with Seirou personally removing his shields and weapons. The fight cost Seirou his left arm and destroyed the building around them. In the confusion, he and Fukutsuzawa slipped away and left for parts unknown. Since then, he has had a one panel cameo in a bonus page wishing readers a happy New Year 2007. How canonical this appearance is in regards to the main story is currently unknown. His personal symbol is a Death Army eye. In the early days of the Elite armour experiments, One of the subjects went wild due to the side effects of the armour. Seirou stepped in to stop him, but his one blow killed the boy. The experiments were halted and the guilt-wracked Seirou made Fukutsuzawa modify his right hand so it could only be used to throw three Blue Thunder (青散打(ブルーサンダー)) punches before the arm exploded. However, when Kokuryuu and Seirou fought, Kokuryuu countered the energy of the explosion with his own Sunrise attack before knocking him out, saving Seirou's life and ending the fight. Seirou apparently also has a talent for 'chilling' puns. Seirou reappears in the final battle, fully repaired and now an ally to Kokuryu. He is last seen training to engage Kokuryuu once more, with giant weights wrapped round his arms with chains.
Fukutsuzawa Yukichi (不屈沢勇気知(ふくつざわゆきち)) - A mysterious man who "heals" Kokuryu after he is shot by Seirou. He appears to be part of the original Elite armour projects and his left eye is cybernetic, with a scar across it. He originally served as a teacher but now works as an engineer. His talents enable him to grant banchou warriors great strength and power. Although initially of questionable motives, both he and Seirou provide aid when Kyouji appears, revealing the history of the Elites. He eventually returned to teaching.
Gu-rei (偶-０(ぐれー))- After the Dom Alliance make short work of a wave of drones, Fukutsuzawa summons the ninja-like Gu-rei who serves as an example of his work. Via the use of an orbital cannon and a long-nosed tengu mask he can use himself as a living bullet to kill enemies. He attempts this on the newly powered up Kokuryu but succeeds only in cracking his own head, after which Kokuryu finishes him off by punching through his chest. After Seirou and Fukutsuzawa escaped from Kokuryu, they found a still active remnant of one of Gu-rei's eyes. Fukutsuzawa subtely implied using this to build an improved Gu-rei, also known as Haien ("Grey Ape Gundam"). He activated this improved version to help during the final battle, and he managed to take out a storm of Earth-bound missiles on his own. He is last seen as a student of Fukutsuzawa.
Banchou Fusion Unofficial name- After the Gigantic Musha Modes prove ineffective, Koubusai granted Kokuryu, Hakuou, Sekijishi, Seirou and Gu-rei the power to combine together into a single warrior. This new Banchou primarily resembled Kokuryu, with elements of the other four.

Gigantic Musha Modes - Gachinko
Kokuryu and Hakuou Combined - Gigantic Musha Mode - When Big-Zami is transformed into a rampaging monster, Kokuryu and Hakuou are forced to combine together to combat her. In this combined form Hakuou forms the upper body whilst Kokuryu forms the legs (a fact Kokuryu was less than happy about), with the overall form being of giant size. It is incredibly powerful but currently Kokuryu and Hakuou can only form it for a short amount of time. Its attack is Mohican. When facing Kyouji, the pair reversed the combination with Kokuryu now serving as the upper body and Hakuou as the legs.
Seirou Combiner - Ankoku Daiseirou/Dark Great Seirou  (暗黒大青狼(あんこくだいせいろう))- Upon initially facing the newly powered up Kokuryu, Seirou reveals his own stand alone Gigantic Musha Mode where he combines with at least three SD Gundam kits. Notably, the kits used are of past SD Gundam villains. Despite his great firepower, he is no match for Kokuryu's Geta Kick and is forced to call upon a brainwashed Sekijishi for further power.
Seirou and Sekijishi Combined - Nikoichi Kyodai Juuou/Giant Beastlord (合身モード認攻一致 巨大獣王(がっしんもーどにこいち きょだいじゅうおう))- During his showdown with Kokuryu, Seirou forces a brainwashed Sekijishi to combine with him and form a second Gigantic Musha Mode. It resembles a four-legged animal, with Seirou at the front and Sekijishi at the back. When facing Kyouji, the pair reversed the combination with Sekijishi now serving as the front and Seirou as the back.

Kokuryuu Daibujin (こくりゅうだいぶじん)- When forced to fight the combined form of Seirou and Sekijishi, Ryuunosuke provides Kokuryu with a Musha Nataku kit, which he combines with to form the gigantic Kokuryu Daibujin. This form takes advantage of the kits own Gigantic Musha Mode, with Kokuryu serving as the upper body and Nataku as the legs. The originally designed model kit version of this design included two further kits. The manga version uses only the Musha Nataku components, though increases their use by adding Nataku's shoulder armour and arms as further armour for the legs. Kokuryu also wields Nataku's large trident. Similar to the combination of Kokuryu and Hakuou, Kokuryu and Nataku's usual heads serve as shoulder armour whilst Kokuryu Daibujin has a head designer closer to that of Gundam tradition including a v-fin on the forehead.

Minor Characters

Jaburou Doterai (土手来若武郎(どてらいじゃぶろう)) - Teacher of Kokuryu and Ryuunosuke's class, he serves as a running gag. He will often try to stop the mecha battles only to be quickly dealt with. When Kokuryu and the others departed to rescue Sekijishi, he intended to go with but missed the train. He finally caught up to them in the aftermath, finding them all bathing in an onsen. Angered by Kokuryuu's ignoring his concern, he slapped Kokuryuu (though greatly bruising his hand in the process). Kokuryuu mentions that one blow hurt more than Seirou's punch. Jaburou manages to shock Kokuryuu out of Banchou mode by threatening to make him take another make-up exam (the first one being ruined by the appearance of Seirou and the Death Teachers). At the end of the series Jaburou transfers to Ryuunosuke's middle high school, as does Elizabeth.
Mama (龍之介のママ(りゅうのすけのママ))- Ryuunosuke's mother. She is overtly positive and bubbly, to extremes which can embarrass her son (such as wedging Kokuryu's face into her breasts to give him a hug). She pops up scantily clad at the hot springs along with Jaburo, much to the delight of the Doms and Kokuryu (and the embarrassment of her son).
Tears Of Time Group'/Toki no Namida-gumi (時乃殴弥陀組(トキノナミダぐみ)) - A gang from the same school as Hakuou, they feud with the Dom Alliance. Kokuryu beat their leader in a one-on-one fight and in doing so learned of the upgrade potential of Gunpla parts, after witnessing The O using parts from a Hadou Musha Mazaku kit. Their leader is The-O/Geo.
Hyaku-Shiki Squad (百死鬼隊(ひゃくしきたい))- A 100-man strong gang from the 7th Musha Elementary School, Hakuou convinces them to take part in a school pride contest to gauge Kokuryu's strength. Kokuryu managed to beat all of them with ease, finishing off their leader with the use of Rekka Dai Hagane's arms. Their leader is Hyaku-Shiki.
Kazueru and Kazuaru- Two seemingly identical boys who are always by Hakuou's side. Kazueru's fringe covers his right eye; Kazuaru's, his left (although there is one panel when this is seemingly reversed). They often serve as aides, bodyguards and/or muscle. After Hakuou was reverted to child form he forced one of them to allow him to sit in their collar and create the illusion he was still in his Bancho form. This plan was foiled when Tomoe grabbed him by the collar for trash talking her, unaware of the deception. They are fully devoted to Hakuou, even risking their lives to save him from attack.
Lady Tomoe (トモエ御前(ともえごぜん)) - Real name Tomoe Gouzen (轟然闘燃(ごうぜんともえ)), she is a tomboy from the 7th School. Just as strong as any male or Mobile Citizen in the school she will only use her strength against those she sees as arrogant, such as Hakuou. Her signature move is the Tomoe Throw, capable of sending enemies to great heights. She encountered Hakuou shortly after his loss to Kokuryu and unintentionally ruined his attempts to hide his transformation back into child form. Despite mocking his smaller form, she was saved by Hakuou after nearly being crushed by a rampaging Big Zami. She develops a crush on Hakuou afterwards but refuses to openly admit it, covering her embarrassment with yet another Tomoe Throw. She later ends up in the same high-class middle high as Hakuou.
Big Zami (ビグザ美) - Tomoe's protegee, her signature attack is the Hyakumon Kick. She became the victim of Death Teacher, who transformed her briefly into a rampaging Big Zam. Upon being rescued she accidentally landed a kiss on Gaia Dom. He has fallen for her, but she still thinks she has kissed Kokuryuu instead. At the end of the series it is said she has gone through an 'image change' and turned herself into a small, sweet blonde girl, but even the editor doubts the fact this is possible.
Elizabeth - Real name Eri Saezu, she works as a teacher and guidance counsellor at the 3rd Musha Elementary School and is generally respected by the students. She spoke to Kokuryu and Enosuke when the two were having difficulty with their studies. During a test the two took, National Language Death Teacher abducted and impersonated her with a simple paper mask. Jaburou was unable to tell the difference.
Ennosuke - Another student at the 3rd Musha Elementary School, Ennosuke is very quiet and shy. He does not do well on exams, which results in lectures from his parents. When he appears, it is a known fact that whenever an exam goes on, he escapes to the school's chicken enclosure. When he and Kokuryu faced a repeat test together, Kokuryu urged him to believe in himself and be proud of his efforts, even if the results don't turn out well. Ennosuke works on a small chicken farm and has a friend who appears to be another young Gundam who starts to look up to Kokuryuu Bancho. In the epilogue both show great growth, with Ennosuke now more outgoing and his Gundam friend having achieved a powerful Banchou form similar to that of Kokuryu, called Kabuki Gundam. (Kabuki Gundam resembles, for some reason, a Red Indian chief.)
Senbee(戦兵衛(せんべえ))- A mysterious, swift and powerful warrior who serves Koubusai. While he was armoured to look like a tengu, specifically a karasu-tengu, the beak was part of a disguise. He was ordered to attack Hakuou to unleash his true power. Senbee is skilled in swordplay and also uses a powerful weapon known as the Sun Cannon (Nichirin Bakuhou (日輪爆砲)).
Koubusai (光武斉(こうぶさい))- An aged and wise Gundam. He warned Kokuryu and Hakuou of the true puppetmaster of the current threats and implied they would need to master their new forms in order to create a new Gigantic Musha powerful enough to defeat this evil. However, both young Gundams misunderstood and have personally boasted they alone will become this powerful warrior.
Jean Claude Gundam - A young upstart who enters Ryuunosuke's middle high school the same year he is about to graduate. A Gundam "with the heart of a lion" and agile legs, he has a slightly Rastafarian look to him. He has the unfortunate distinction of being thrashed by both Kabuki Gundam and Ankokuryuu Gundam (Saikyouin) on the same day.
 Retsumaru and Mobile Musha Rekka Dai Hagane from Ichishiki's previous series SD Gundam Force Emaki Musharetsuden appear as props to explain the hobby of SD kit customising. Later, Kokuryu briefly uses Rekka Dai Hagane's arms.

Enemies

Death Teachers- The villainous faculty of the 6th Northeast Circle Musha Primary School. Soon after Kokuryu transfers, they begin to harass the other schools. Despite being based on various enemy mecha from across the Gundam franchise, all have the eye design introduced by the Death Army in Mobile Fighter G Gundam.
Science Death Teacher (痢加凶師(リカデスティーチャー))- The first Death Teacher to appear, resembling the Death Master from Mobile Fighter G Gundam. He attached a device to Big-Zami which transformed her into a rampaging giant. Afterwards was sent flying by a punch from Kokuryu.
Gaza Captain (我座C(ガザキャプテン))- Head of the Doros Ocean Primary School who resembles an AMX-003 Gaza-C from Mobile Suit Zeta Gundam. He smokes a corncob pipe and can transform into a shark-like combat form. His Death Army eye is disguised by a more classic Zeonic mono-eye design. He planned to convert living humans into brainless mechanical drones. While in disguise, he is also known for his occasional spoonerisms, saying things like Konasan, minnichiwa!
National Language Death Teacher (酷悟凶師(コクゴデスティーチャ-))- Resembles a MS-14 Gelgoog from Mobile Suit Gundam. He disguised himself as Eri during a test resit Kokuryu took, hoping to make him fail the test so he would be removed from the school and unable to further thwart the Death Teacher's plans.
Arithmetics Death Teacher (惨趨凶師(サンスウデスティーチャー))
Art Death Teacher (頭荒凶師(ズコウデスティーチャ-))
Social Death Teacher (射魁凶師(シャカイデスティーチャ-))- Three teachers who personally challenged Seirou in the frozen plains surrounding their school. Despite each utilising a group of Elite drones, Seirou hunted down and terminated all three of them one by one.
Elite(優等生(えりいと))- Drones built somewhat in Kokuryu's image. There are also cases of Elite Armour, which transform ordinary students into drones controlled by the Daibanchou.
Kyouji Saikyouin/Ankokuryuu Bancho- The 'Dark Dragon' bancho. A mysterious transfer student, Kyouji excels at all academic activities. Despite his small size he shows great strength. It is eventually revealed that he is a disguised dragon-like Banchou, linked to the Elite armours. Under his human guise, Kyouji convinces countless children to accept the intoxicating powers of the Elite armour to build an army. He attempted to use Tokyo Tower as a powerful transmitter to summon his converted horde but was stopped by an alliance of Kokuryu, Hakuou, Sekijishi and Seirou. Kyouji responded by using all the armour devices to create a gigantic body for himself, forcing his opponents to engage in Gigantic Musha Mode combinations to fight back. He eventually managed to reduce all four to their Banchou forms and continued to duel the much smaller Kokuryu. In the end, however, he realises what Kokuryuu is fighting for and changes sides, returning to Earth to start over. Kyouji enjoys milk, receiving a power boost from its consumption.

Schools
3rd Musha Elementary School - School attended by Kokuryu, Ryuunosuke and the Dom Alliance. A fairly average elementary school in which students are educated in such things as Musha Gundam history.
6th Northeast Circle Musha Primary School - A school surrounded by ice.
7th Private Musha Elementary School - School attended by Hakuou, Tomoe, Big Zami, the Hyaku-Shiki Squad and the Tears Of Time Group.
Doros Ocean Primary School - A school in a ship. At the beginning of the world, fishing and swimming in sea were banned, so the school's purpose remained a mystery.

Collected volumes bonus content
The collected third and fourth volume present extra content that was not seen in the original Comic BomBom publishing. Volume three contains a trio of yonkomas focusing on:

Mama's affection for Kokuryu's chibi form
The Dom's rented accommodation
Tomoe's crush on Hakuou

As the series was Ichishiki's final SD Gundam work, volume four presentes a bonus chapter in which Kokuryu encounters Mushamaru, Wakamaru, Bakimaru and Retsumaru, the leads of the three previous series penned by Ichishiki.

Model kits
BB #287- Kokuryu Gundam
BB #289- Hakuou Gundam
BB #291- Sekijishi Gundam
BB #292- Seirou Gundam

The major gimmick for the model kits is their ability to combine into pre-designed forms. For example, both Kokuryu and Hakuou can transform into the legs or upper body of a larger Gundam design and combine to create a completed Gundam model. However, playing into the popularity of SD Gundam customisation, the models also suggest various other ways to make a combination. These include:
Combining the most recently released kit with parts from at least three older kits (these kits are re-issued along with the original release of said Musha Banchō Fūunroku kit), an idea the manga further promotes with the concept that the Mobile Citizen characters are capable of turning SD Gundam model kit parts into usable upgrades for themselves. More specifically, later chapters of the manga show Kokuryu and Seirou Gundam specifically transforming into the multi-kit combiners shown on the packaging of their respective model kits.

Kokuryu Gundam- BB 156, BB 170, BB 194

Hakuou Gundam- BB 171, BB 172, BB 192

Sekijishi Gundam- BB 161, BB 164, BB 173

Seirou Gundam- BB 93, BB 150, BB 178

Additionally, the boxes for the Kokuryu Gundam and Hakuou Gundam kits suggest combining them with weapons from

Kokuryu Gundam- BB 127, BB 135, BB 162, BB 174

Hakuou Gundam- BB 126, BB 127, BB 135, BB 162

Buying two of a kit, transforming each one into the different combination segments and combining them together.

By itself, each kit can form one of two forms- a smaller child form or a larger adult form. The child form makes use of a limited number of parts (usually at least the head and torso) whilst the adult forms use all of them. Kokuryu and Hakuou come with instructions for combining their left over parts into catapult-like weapons.

In the manga, the Gundams upgrade themselves using cuts of a special scroll. A simulated length of this scroll was included with Hakuou Gundam's kit. Similarly, Sekijishi Gundam comes with a makeshift stand for his surfboard which is made from the smallest parts runner and a cardboard wave cut out from the side of the top lid of the box.

After the release of BB #292 Seirou Gundam in August 2006 the line entered a hiatus with no further kits from the series produced. With the continuation of the manga and the recent unveiling of new forms for Kokuryu and Hakuou, it remains to be seen if any further kits shall be produced.

The manga presents several kits that don't exist in reality, such as a High Grade Leo from Gundam Wing. Both Kokuryu and Hakuou can combine their forearm armour onto their forehead as a weapon. Notes on the instruction sheet for Kokuryu's model kit imply Ichishiki based the look on a large quiff, a hairstyle commonly associated with bancho culture in Japan.

External links

Information links
Musha Banchō dictionary (Japanese)

Publisher links
Comic BomBom home page

Musha Bancho Fuunroku
Martial arts anime and manga
Comedy anime and manga
School life in anime and manga
2006 manga
Shōnen manga
Yonkoma